Mary Franklin (1800–1867) and her sister Rebecca Franklin (1803–1873) were English schoolmistresses in Coventry. Their Nant Glyn school attracted a wide range of students from the UK and abroad. Their students included the ribbon weaver Charles Bray and the novelist George Eliot.

Life
Franklin was the eldest of the ten children of Francis and Ann Franklin. Her father was minister of the Cow Lane Chapel in Coventry and it is assumed that she was born in the same city.
Three of her siblings died as children. She first went to teach schoolchildren in Bocking in Essex before she returned to teach girls and boys in her parents' house. Her students included the future philosopher Charles Bray.
Her siblings included aspiring missionaries but her sister Rebecca also wanted to teach and she had studied in France for a year. Rebecca was the third daughter and was born in 1803. Actually Rebecca had a school first and it was then that they decided on a partnership.

The two sisters opened their own day and boarding school and Nant Glyn school operated from various Coventry addresses ending in Little Park Street. The students were offered music, French and German from guest teachers, but the basic education came from the Franklin sisters. Mary was considered more maternal but the overall atmosphere was strict and orderly. Rebecca was keen on deportment and that students should speak in grammatically correct and thought out sentences. Each Sunday the pupils would attend Mary and Rebecca's father's Baptist chapel.  Mary Ann Evans (later George Eliot) was one of the boarders at the school from age thirteen to sixteen. Evans was exposed to a quiet, disciplined belief opposed to evangelicalism. Evans was to include Mary's father in one of her novels.

Mary died on 4 December 1867 at the home she and her sister had retired to in Coventry. Rebecca died in Coventry on 29 May 1873.

References

1800 births
1867 deaths
People from Coventry
Schoolteachers from the West Midlands
English women educators
19th-century English educators
19th-century women educators
19th-century English women